Safet Jahič (born 25 January 1987) is a Slovenian professional footballer who plays as a goalkeeper for Csácsbozsok in Hungary.

Club career
Born in Slovenj Gradec, Jahič came through the youth academy of Rudar Velenje. He moved to Greece at the age of 18 by signing with Panionios. Jahič was included in their first team squad for the 2005–06 season, but failed to make any appearance.

On 4 August 2006, Jahič was transferred to Partizan, penning a four-year deal. He was one of 12 players to join the club during that transfer window. Mainly a backup to veteran Ivica Kralj, Jahič made five league and two UEFA Cup appearances during the 2006–07 season. He eventually left the club after the first year of his contract.

After leaving Serbia, Jahič returned to Slovenia by joining his former club Rudar Velenje. He spent the following four seasons there, making 52 league appearances for the team.

In the summer of 2011, Jahič moved abroad for the second time by signing with Hungarian side Zalaegerszeg. He made 53 league appearances for the club, before moving to Kaposvár in the 2014 winter transfer window. After six months without a club, Jahič signed an 18-month contract with Dunaújváros in January 2015.

International career
Jahič represented his country at under-17, under-19 and under-21 level.

Notes

References

External links
 NZS profile
 HLSZ profile
 
 

Association football goalkeepers
Dunaújváros PASE players
Expatriate footballers in Austria
Expatriate footballers in Greece
Expatriate footballers in Hungary
Expatriate footballers in Serbia
FK Partizan players
FK Teleoptik players
Kaposvári Rákóczi FC players
Nemzeti Bajnokság I players
NK Rudar Velenje players
Panionios F.C. players
Serbian SuperLiga players
Slovenia under-21 international footballers
Slovenia youth international footballers
Slovenian expatriate footballers
Slovenian expatriate sportspeople in Austria
Slovenian expatriate sportspeople in Greece
Slovenian expatriate sportspeople in Hungary
Slovenian expatriate sportspeople in Serbia
Slovenian footballers
Slovenian PrvaLiga players
Sportspeople from Slovenj Gradec
Zalaegerszegi TE players
1987 births
Living people